Pholeomyia is a genus of freeloader flies in the family Milichiidae. There are more than 30 described species in Pholeomyia.

Species
These 39 species belong to the genus Pholeomyia:

 Pholeomyia aequatoralis Seguy, 1934
 Pholeomyia anomala Hendel, 1933
 Pholeomyia anthracina (Becker, 1907)
 Pholeomyia argyrata Hendel, 1932
 Pholeomyia argyrophenga (Schiner, 1868)
 Pholeomyia comans Sabrosky, 1959
 Pholeomyia dampfi Sabrosky, 1959
 Pholeomyia decorior Steyskal, 1943
 Pholeomyia dispar (Becker, 1907)
 Pholeomyia excelsior (Becker, 1907)
 Pholeomyia expansa Aldrich, 1925
 Pholeomyia fasciventris (Becker, 1907)
 Pholeomyia hurdi Sabrosky, 1959
 Pholeomyia implicata (Becker, 1907)
 Pholeomyia indecora (Loew, 1869)
 Pholeomyia insecta (Becker, 1907)
 Pholeomyia latifrons Sabrosky, 1959
 Pholeomyia leucogastra (Loew, 1861)
 Pholeomyia leucozona Bilimek, 1867
 Pholeomyia longifacies Hendel, 1933
 Pholeomyia longiseta (Becker, 1907)
 Pholeomyia myopa Melander, 1913
 Pholeomyia nigricosta (Hendel, 1932)
 Pholeomyia nitidula Sabrosky, 1959
 Pholeomyia obscura Sabrosky, 1959
 Pholeomyia palparis (Becker, 1907)
 Pholeomyia pectoralis Hendel, 1932
 Pholeomyia politifacies Sabrosky, 1959
 Pholeomyia praeocellaris Hendel, 1932
 Pholeomyia praesecta (Becker, 1907)
 Pholeomyia prominens (Becker, 1907)
 Pholeomyia pseudodecora (Becker, 1907)
 Pholeomyia quadrifasciata Hendel, 1932
 Pholeomyia robertsoni (Coquillett, 1902)
 Pholeomyia schineri (Hendel, 1932)
 Pholeomyia schnusei (Becker, 1907)
 Pholeomyia sororcula (Becker, 1907)
 Pholeomyia texensis Sabrosky, 1959
 Pholeomyia vockerothi Sabrosky, 1961

References

Further reading

 

Carnoidea genera
Articles created by Qbugbot
Milichiidae